Martyn 'Bomber' Bradbury (born 1974) is a New Zealand media commentator, former radio and TV host, and former executive producer of Alt TV – a now-defunct alternative music and culture channel. He is a blogger that writes at the blogs Tumeke! and The Daily Blog. Bradbury was given the nickname 'Bomber' by a former Craccum editor, reputedly to describe his bombastic personality. He has been described by the New Zealand Listener as the "most opinionated man in New Zealand". He has defended his decision to block a number of women on social media and referred to reasons for disputes with five women who previously contributed to "The Daily Blog".

Print media
Bradbury was the elected editor of the Auckland University Students' Association's (AUSA) Craccum magazine for the 1997 year, and elected co-editor with Stuart Gardiner for the 1995 year. Before that he was the poetry editor. According to Bradbury, he picked up the nickname Bomber from one of the editors of Craccum.

Bradbury is a former editor (2004–05) of New Zealand music magazine Rip It Up.

Radio
Prior to his television work Bradbury was the host of the 'Late night talk lounge' on defunct alternative music station Channel Z from 1996 until 1998, as well as a regular DJ during various time slots. Until late 2011, he was a guest on various panel discussions on "Afternoons with Jim Mora' on Radio New Zealand (RNZ).

Radio New Zealand saga 
After a regular guest spot on RNZ's show The Panel, the network withdrew an invitation for Bradbury to return as a panellist. While Bradbury claimed he had been "banned" for criticising the New Zealand Prime Minister, John Key, RNZ said he had not been banned, and that he had been removed as a panellist after breaching their editorial policy. According to Radio NZ "Mr Bradbury’s comments were inconsistent with information that he had provided to programme producers before going on air. Mr Bradbury later apologised to the programme’s executive producer. It was made clear to him that while his invitation to appear as an occasional guest on The Panel was being withdrawn, it was not a 'lifelong ban' and it did not apply to other Radio New Zealand programmes".

Television
Bradbury hosted Bomber's Blog – the war on news, on Triangle TV – renamed Face TV before it disbanded. He hosted an investigative television series called Stake-Out which used hidden cameras to catch people in the act of committing criminal or immoral acts on film. He hosted Citizen A on Face TV.

Politics

Mana Movement
Martyn Bradbury was a consultant to the Mana party until 2013, and provided a draft strategy document for the Kim Dotcom Internet Party in 2014. He was influential in promoting public opposition to expansion of GCSB spying powers.

Colin Craig defamation trial

On 23 September 2016, Martyn Bradbury testified as a defence witness in Jordan Williams' defamation trial against Colin Craig, the former leader of the Conservative Party. Williams, the co-founder of the New Zealand Taxpayers' Union had filed a defamation suit against Craig after the latter had produced a pamphlet entitled "Dirty Politics and Hidden Agenda" attacking Williams, the right-wing blogger Cameron Slater, and a dissident Party member John Stringer. In his testimony, Bradbury alleged that Williams had embarked on a political hit job against Craig and defended Craig's pamphlet. Bradbury described the trial as "an angry fight between two people who don't like each other much." Bradbury was also questioned by Williams' lawyer Peter McKnight for making alleged defamatory comments against Williams in The Daily Blog. Some in the media credited Bradbury for the extent of damages awarded to Williams.

Views and positions

South Canterbury Finance bubble
Bradbury was highly critical of the late finance company owner Alan Hubbard, whose company was placed under statutory management by the-then Justice Minister Simon Power.

Conversion therapy ban legislation

In response to the Government's proposed conversion practices legislation in 2021 which seeks to ban gay conversion therapy, Bradbury criticised bill's five year prison term as form of "government overreach" which distracted from the Government's failure to address what he regarded as their failed mental health, poverty and housing policies.

References

External links 
Tumeke! blog
The Daily Blog

1974 births
Living people
New Zealand bloggers
University of Auckland alumni